Marvin Edwin Bevan (July 6, 1935 – June 23, 2019) was a Canadian football player who played for the Ottawa Rough Riders. He won the Grey Cup with them in 1960. He was the brother of Eddie Bevan of the Hamilton Tiger-Cats.

References

1935 births
2019 deaths
Sportspeople from Hamilton, Ontario
Players of Canadian football from Ontario
Ottawa Rough Riders